Dash Bolagh Bazar (also Romanized as Dāsh Bolāgh-e Bāzār and Dāsh Bolāgh Bāzār; also known as Dāsh Bolagh) is a village in Quri Chay-ye Gharbi Rural District of Saraju District, Maragheh County, East Azerbaijan province, Iran. At the 2006 National Census, its population was 270 in 55 households. The following census in 2011 counted 287 people in 64 households. The latest census in 2016 showed a population of 238 people in 68 households; it was the largest village in its rural district.

References 

Maragheh County

Populated places in East Azerbaijan Province

Populated places in Maragheh County